David Boardman is a football manager.

Career
Boardman was the head coach of the New Zealand women's national team at the 1991 FIFA Women's World Cup.

References

External links
 
 

Year of birth missing (living people)
Living people
New Zealand association football coaches
Women's association football managers
New Zealand women's national football team managers
1991 FIFA Women's World Cup managers